Doğa Kaya (born June 30, 1984) is a former Turkish football player who played in central midfielder position. He has capped 85 times in various National Team levels of Turkey except category A.

References

External links
 Profile at TFF.org 

1984 births
Living people
Turkish footballers
Süper Lig players
Gençlerbirliği S.K. footballers
Eskişehirspor footballers
Antalyaspor footballers
Sivasspor footballers
Hacettepe S.K. footballers
Footballers from Ankara
Turkey youth international footballers
Association football midfielders
Mediterranean Games silver medalists for Turkey
Mediterranean Games medalists in football
Competitors at the 2005 Mediterranean Games